Michelle Slaughter (born 1978) is a Judge of the Texas Court of Criminal Appeals

Education 

Slaughter received her Bachelor of Arts from the University of Houston and her Juris Doctor from the University of Houston Law Center in 2004.

Legal career 

Upon graduating law school, she clerked with Haynes and Boone. Before taking the bench she was a managing member at Slaughter & Hammock and from 2005–2010 practiced at Locke Lord.

State judicial service 

Slaughter campaigned to be a Judge for the 405th District Court of Galveston County and took office in 2013. In 2015, she was cleared of any wrongdoing by a judicial panel after concern was raised over personal Facebook posts regarding a trial she was overseeing.

In March 2018, she won the Republican primary to be a Judge on the Texas Court of Criminal Appeals. Her opponent in the General Election was Libertarian Mark Ash. She went on to win the general election, receiving 4,760,576 votes or 74% of the vote. Her term on the Texas Criminal Court of Appeals began on January 1, 2019 and she replaced Judge Elsa Alcala.

Personal life

Slaughter is a Republican.

References

External links 

Place of birth missing (living people)
Living people
21st-century American judges
21st-century American lawyers
American women lawyers
Judges of the Texas Court of Criminal Appeals
Texas lawyers
Texas Republicans
Texas state court judges
University of Houston alumni
University of Houston Law Center alumni
1978 births
21st-century American women judges